The 1992 United States presidential election in Iowa took place on November 3, 1992, as part of the 1992 United States presidential election. Voters chose seven representatives, or electors to the Electoral College, who voted for president and vice president.

Iowa was won by Democratic Governor Bill Clinton of Arkansas with 43.29% of the popular vote over incumbent Republican President George H. W. Bush's 37.27%, a victory margin of 6.01%. Independent businessman Ross Perot finished in third, with 18.71% of the popular vote. Clinton ultimately won the national vote, defeating incumbent President Bush and Perot. Iowa was the only state which swung more Republican than it had been in 1988.

With Iowa voting against Bush twice, he became the sixth and currently last American president to have ever been elected into office without winning the state in an election.  He is also the first and only Republican to ever been elected president and lose the state twice.

Democratic caucuses

In the presidential caucuses most candidates for the Democratic nomination did not campaign in Iowa because of the presence of Tom Harkin, a longtime U.S. Senator representing Iowa.

Harkin was running for president in 1992 as a populist with labor union support who criticized George H. W. Bush for being out of touch with working class Americans.  Harkin was an early favorite in a small field of five candidates. Harkin easily won the caucus with 76% of the vote, uncommitted got second place with 11%, Senator Paul Tsongas came in third, with 4%, and Governor Bill Clinton finished fourth, with 2%.

Voter turnout in the caucuses fell from over 120,000 in the 1988 caucus to less than 40,000. Voter turnout would later increase to around 120,000 for the 2000 caucuses. As the race was not contested, these results had little effect on the remaining primaries, and the New Hampshire primary took on added importance.

Tom Harkin won every county by large margins. The delegate totals reflect their final distribution, not their projected allocation immediately following the caucus.

By congressional district

Results

Results by county

See also
 United States presidential elections in Iowa

References

1992
Iowa
United States president